Rezvan Rural District is a rural district (dehestan) in Jebalbarez District, Jiroft County, Kerman Province, Iran. At the 2006 census, its population was 2,555, in 573 families. The rural district has 55 villages.

References 

Rural Districts of Kerman Province
Jiroft County